Christopher Rich Wilson (born September 16, 1953, in Dallas, Texas) is an American actor, best known for his roles on Murphy Brown, Reba, and Boston Legal.

Career
Rich first became popular playing the role of Alexander "Sandy" Cory on the daytime drama Another World from 1981 to 1985. He also starred in the short-lived 1987–1988 series The Charmings as Prince Eric Charming, with Carol Huston, Caitlin O'Heaney, Judy Parfitt, and Paul Winfield.

In 1990, Rich played the role of popular cartoon character Archie Andrews in the TV film Archie: To Riverdale and Back Again. The film was based on the characters of Archie Comics. Rich then appeared in the 1993 film The Joy Luck Club.

During the 1990s, Rich had guest appearances in several television shows like Renegade, The Nanny, Suddenly Susan, and ER, among others. He also had recurring roles in The George Carlin Show (as Dr. Neil Beck), Murphy Brown (as Miller Redfield), and Nash Bridges (as Agent David Katz).

In 2001, Rich joined the cast of Reba playing Brock Hart, the ex-husband of the title character (played by Reba McEntire). Rich stayed in the show until the end of the series in 2007, as well as directing several episodes in Seasons 5 and 6.

During this time, Rich also had a recurring role on Boston Legal playing attorney Melvin Palmer. After that, he also played Bree's book publisher, Bruce, on two episodes of ABC's Desperate Housewives. He also played Mel's father in the TV series Melissa & Joey.

Personal life
Rich attended the University of Texas and received a master's degree in theater arts from Cornell University. He was married to Another World co-star Nancy Frangione from 1982 until 1996. 

He is currently married to his second wife (since 2003), Eva Rich ( Ewa Halina  Jesionowska), a Miss Poland 1985 finalist and former gymnast who participated at the 1980 Summer Olympics in Moscow. Rich has fraternal twin daughters with Eva, Lily and Daisy Rich, and a daughter with Frangione, Mariel Rich. 

In 2015, Christopher and Eva Rich and their two daughters appeared in first two seasons of the Polish reality TV series called Żony Hollywood (English Hollywood Wives) based on The Real Housewives franchise, in which his wife, Eva, was one of the stars.

Filmography

Film

Television

References

External links

 Christopher Rich at the Country Music Television

American male soap opera actors
American male television actors
Cornell University alumni
1953 births
Living people
Male actors from Dallas
20th-century American male actors
21st-century American male actors
University of Texas at Austin alumni